|}

The Supreme Stakes is a flat horse race in Great Britain open to horses aged three years or older. It is run at Goodwood over a distance of 7 furlongs (1,408 metres), and it is scheduled to take place each year in late August or early September.

History
The event was established in 1981, and was originally a Listed race called the Harroways Stakes. It was named after the Harroways, an area of the Goodwood Estate where the racecourse was founded. It was upgraded to Group 3 and given its present title in 1987. The race lost its Group 3 status when it was removed from the Pattern and Listed race programme in 2023.

The Supreme Stakes was formerly held in late September or early October. It was brought forward to an earlier date in 2007.

Records
Most successful horse (2 wins):
 Sarab – 1984, 1986
 Decorated Hero – 1997, 1998

Leading jockey (3 wins):
 Richard Quinn – Sarab (1984, 1986), Inzar (1995)
 Frankie Dettori – Decorated Hero (1998), Firebreak (2002), With Reason (2003)
 Richard Hughes - Stronghold (2006), Libranno (2011), Producer (2012)

Leading trainer (5 wins):
 John Gosden – Anshan (1990), Decorated Hero (1997, 1998), Mount Abu (2000), Stronghold (2006)

Winners

See also
 Horse racing in Great Britain
 List of British flat horse races
 Recurring sporting events established in 1981 – this race is included under its original title, Harroways Stakes.

References

 Paris-Turf: 
 Racing Post:

 galopp-sieger.de – Supreme Stakes.
 ihfaonline.org – International Federation of Horseracing Authorities – Supreme Stakes (2019).
 pedigreequery.com – Supreme Stakes – Goodwood.
 

Flat races in Great Britain
Goodwood Racecourse
Open mile category horse races
1981 establishments in England